Lady Amherst's pheasant (Chrysolophus amherstiae) is a bird of the order Galliformes and the family Phasianidae. The genus name is from Ancient Greek khrusolophos, "with golden crest". The English name and amherstiae commemorates Sarah Amherst, who was responsible for sending the first specimen of the bird to London in 1828. Lady Amherst's pheasant is evaluated as Least Concern on the IUCN Red List of Threatened Species.

Distribution and habitat
The species is native to southwestern China and far northern Myanmar, but has been introduced elsewhere. Previously, a self-supporting feral population was established in England, the stronghold of which was in West Bedfordshire.  Lady Amherst first introduced the ornamental pheasant on her estates, near the Duke of Bedford's Woburn Abbey, where the birds were also shot for game and interbred. Although the introduced British populations are believed to have been extinct since 2015, occasional sightings of the species have occurred in subsequent years; a Lady Amherst's pheasant was photographed in Staplegrove, Taunton in May 2020, and subsequently, in early March 2021, a Lady Amherst's pheasant was spotted in a garden in Scotland.

Description
It is unmistakable with its nuchal cape white black, with a red crest. The long grey tail and rump is red, blue, dark green, white and yellow plumage. The "cape" can be raised in display. This species is closely related to the golden pheasant (C. pictus), but has a yellow eye, blue-green bare skin around it. The bill is horn-coloured and they had blue-gray legs. 
 
The female is much less showy, with a duller mottled brown plumage all over, similar to that of the female common pheasant (P. colchicus) but with finer barring.  She is very like the female golden pheasant, but has a darker head and cleaner underparts than the hen of that species.

Despite the male's showy appearance, these birds are very difficult to see in their natural habitat, which is dense, dark forests with thick undergrowth. Consequently, little is known of their behaviour in the wild.

Diet and behaviour
They feed on the ground on grain, leaves and invertebrates, but roost in trees at night. Whilst they can fly, they prefer to run, but if startled they can suddenly burst upwards at great speed, with a distinctive wing sound.  The male emits a metallic call in the breeding season.

Gallery

References 

Bibliography

External links 
 BirdLife Species Factsheet

Lady Amherst's pheasant
Birds of Yunnan
Birds of Myanmar
Lady Amherst's pheasant